Chetwynd is an unincorporated community in Green Township, Morgan County, in the U.S. state of Indiana.

History
A post office was established at Chetwynd in 1887, and remained in operation until it was discontinued in 1900.

Geography

References

Unincorporated communities in Morgan County, Indiana
Unincorporated communities in Indiana